The Royal Danish Theatre (RDT,) is both the national Danish performing arts institution and a name used to refer to its old purpose-built venue from 1874 located on Kongens Nytorv in Copenhagen. The theatre was founded in 1748, first serving as the theatre of the king, and then as the theatre of the country. The theatre presents opera, the Royal Danish Ballet, multi-genre concerts, and drama in several locations. The Royal Danish Theatre organization is under the control of the Danish Ministry of Culture.

Performing arts venues
 The Old Stage is the original Royal Danish Theatre built in 1874.
 The Copenhagen Opera House (Operaen), built in 2004.
 Stærekassen (New Stage) is an Art Deco theatre adjacent to the main theatre. It was used for drama productions. It is no longer used by the Royal Theatre.
 The Royal Danish Playhouse is a venue for "spoken theatre" with three stages, inaugurated in 2008.

Cultural references
 The Royal Theatre on Kongens Nytorv is a central location in the 1978 Olsen-banden film The Olsen Gang Sees Red (from 1:16:58).
 The Royal Theatre is the location of several important scenes in the 2015 drama film The Danish Girl where Einar (Eddie Redmayne) begins to acknowledge his feminine side.

See also
 Copenhagen Opera House
 Royal Danish Ballet
 Royal Danish Ballet school
 Royal Danish Orchestra
 Edvard Fallesen, General Director of the Royal Danish Theatre from 1876 to 1894

References

External links

 Official Danish-language website of the Royal Danish Theatre
 Official English-language page of the Royal Danish Theatre
 Skuespilhuset
 The Royal Danish Theatre and HC Andersen

Theatres in Copenhagen
Opera houses in Denmark
Listed theatres in Denmark
Concert halls in Copenhagen
Dance in Copenhagen
Ballet venues
Danish opera companies
Danish culture
Theatre
Organizations based in Copenhagen
Historicist architecture in Copenhagen
Arts in Copenhagen
1748 establishments in Denmark
Theatres completed in 1874
Organizations established in 1748
Music venues completed in 1874
Gammelholm